The Ministry of Religion of the Republic of Serbia was the ministry in the Government of Serbia which was in charge of religion. The ministry was merged into the Ministry of Diaspora on 14 March 2011. Ministry of Diaspora, in turn, merged into the Ministry of Culture and Information on 27 July 2012.

List of ministers

External links
Serbian Ministry of Diaspora

Defunct government ministries of Serbia
1991 establishments in Serbia
Ministries established in 1991
2011 disestablishments in Serbia
Ministries disestablished in 2011
Serbia